Rinn Lough (also ), also known as Lough Rynn, is a freshwater lake in the northwest of Ireland. It is located in south County Leitrim.

Geography
Lough Rynn Castle, a medieval castle now a hotel, occupies an estate on the lake's northeastern shore.

Hydrology
Two smaller neighbouring lakes drain into Rinn Lough: Clooncoc Lough and Lough Errew. Rinn Lough drains south into the Rinn River flowing into Lough Forbes. Part of the river forms the Rinn River Natural Heritage Area.

Ecology
The water quality was reported to be satisfactory  maintaining a mesotrophic rating. but given a ""  due to pollution. Zebra mussel infestation is present.  The ecology of Rinn Lough, and Irish waterways, remains threatened by curly waterweed, zebra mussel, and freshwater clam invasive species.

See also
List of loughs in Ireland

References and notes

Notes

Primary sources

Secondary sources

Rinn
Mohill